Events from the year 1830 in Algeria.

Events
 July 5 – France invades Algiers.

Arts and literature

Births

Deaths

References

 
Algeria
Algeria
Years of the 19th century in Algeria